This is a list of notable events in country music that took place in the year 1974.

Events
 March 16 — The Grand Ole Opry moves from the Ryman Auditorium, its home of the past 41 years, to the newly constructed 4,400-seat Grand Ole Opry House, on the Opryland complex. President Richard Nixon is a guest at the Ryman's last show. The Ryman would essentially sit vacant for the next two decades before being renovated in the early 1990s as a historical landmark and concert hall.
 July 17 — Don Rich, a key member of Buck Owens' backing band, The Buckaroos, is killed in a motorcycle crash on State Route 99 north of Bakersfield, California; he was 32. Owens is deeply saddened by Rich's death, and it will gravely affect his career for many years.
 October 17 — The pilot episode of Austin City Limits, featuring Willie Nelson, is recorded, and will air during PBS' 1975 pledge drive.

No dates
 Country purists, long troubled by a growing trend of pop music-influenced country, form the Association of Country Entertainers,  as a result of the outcry over the 1974 Country Music Association awards program, where pop diva Olivia Newton-John won Female Vocalist of the Year, and Danny Davis & the Nashville Brass was awarded another Instrumental Group of the Year.
 The proliferation of No. 1 hits, as certified by Billboard, extends into 1974, when 40 songs reach the top of the Hot Country Singles chart. In fact, just nine songs – 10, counting Merle Haggard's "If We Make It Through December", which spent two of its four weeks at No. 1 in January – remain at the top spot for more than one week.
 Dolly Parton leaves Porter Wagoner's band and his weekly television show, after seven years, to embark on a solo career.
 Loretta Lynn releases "The Pill", a sexually frank song about birth control. The song is deemed too controversial and most country stations refuse to play it.

Top hits of the year

Number-one hits

United States
(as certified by Billboard)

Notes
1^ No. 1 song of the year, as determined by Billboard.
A^ First Billboard No. 1 hit for that artist.
B^ Last Billboard No. 1 hit for that artist.
C^ Only Billboard No. 1 hit for that artist to date.

Canada
(as certified by RPM)

Notes
A^ First RPM No. 1 hit for that artist.
B^ Last RPM No. 1 hit for that artist.
C^ Only RPM No. 1 hit for that artist.

Other major hits

Singles released by American artists

Singles released by Canadian artists

Top new album releases

Other top albums

Births
January 7 — John Rich, singer-songwriter and member of Big & Rich.
February 17 – Chuck Dauphin, American sports radio broadcaster and country music journalist (died 2019).
February 17 — Bryan White, singer-songwriter from the 1990s.
March 18 – Phillip Sweet, member of Little Big Town.
May 23 – Jewel, multi-genre singer-songwriter who released the country album Perfectly Clear in 2008.
June 6 – Uncle Kracker, rock singer who has had major country successes with "When the Sun Goes Down" (duet with Kenny Chesney) and "Smile."
September 12 — Jennifer Nettles, lead singer of Sugarland.
October 14 — Natalie Maines, lead singer of the Dixie Chicks.
November 21 — Kelsi Osborn, member of SHeDAISY.

Deaths
 January 2 — Tex Ritter, 68, silver screen cowboy and western artist (heart attack).
 April 26 – Tim Spencer, 65, member of the Sons of the Pioneers.
 July 17 — Don Rich, 32, right-hand man of Buck Owens and key member of the Buckaroos (motorcycle crash).

Country Music Hall of Fame Inductees
Owen Bradley (1915–1998)
Pee Wee King (1914–2000)

Major awards

Grammy Awards
Best Female Country Vocal Performance — "A Love Song", Anne Murray
Best Male Country Vocal Performance — "Please Don't Tell Me How the Story Ends", Ronnie Milsap
Best Country Performance by a Duo or Group with Vocal — "Fairytale", The Pointer Sisters
Best Country Instrumental Performance — The Atkins - Travis Traveling Show, Chet Atkins and Merle Travis
Best Country Song — "A Very Special Love Song", Billy Sherrill and Norro Wilson (Performer: Charlie Rich)

Juno Awards
Country Male Vocalist of the Year — Stompin' Tom Connors
Country Female Vocalist of the Year — Shirley Eikhard
Country Group or Duo of the Year — Mercey Brothers

Academy of Country Music
Entertainer of the Year — Mac Davis
Song of the Year — "Country Bumpkin", Don Wayne (Performer: Cal Smith)
Single of the Year — "Country Bumpkin", Cal Smith
Album of the Year — Back Home Again, John Denver
Top Male Vocalist — Merle Haggard
Top Female Vocalist — Loretta Lynn
Top Vocal Duo — Conway Twitty and Loretta Lynn
Top New Male Vocalist — Mickey Gilley
Top New Female Vocalist — Linda Ronstadt

Country Music Association
Entertainer of the Year — Charlie Rich
Song of the Year — "Country Bumpkin", Don Wayne (Performer: Cal Smith)
Single of the Year — "Country Bumpkin", Cal Smith
Album of the Year — A Very Special Love Song, Charlie Rich
Male Vocalist of the Year — Ronnie Milsap
Female Vocalist of the Year — Olivia Newton-John
Vocal Duo of the Year — Conway Twitty and Loretta Lynn
Vocal Group of the Year — The Statler Brothers
Instrumentalist of the Year — Don Rich
Instrumental Group of the Year — Danny Davis and the Nashville Brass

Further reading
Kingsbury, Paul, "The Grand Ole Opry: History of Country Music. 70 Years of the Songs, the Stars and the Stories," Villard Books, Random House; Opryland USA, 1995
Kingsbury, Paul, "Vinyl Hayride: Country Music Album Covers 1947–1989," Country Music Foundation, 2003
Millard, Bob, "Country Music: 70 Years of America's Favorite Music," HarperCollins, New York, 1993
Whitburn, Joel, "Top Country Songs 1944–2005 – 6th Edition." 2005.

References

Other links
Country Music Association
Inductees of the Country Music Hall of Fame

External links
Country Music Hall of Fame

Country
Country music by year